Pakistan competed in the Summer Olympic Games for the first time at the 1948 Summer Olympics in Wembley Park, London, England. 35 competitors, all men, took part in 20 events in 6 sports.

Athletics

Men's 100 metres
 Mohammad Abdullah
 Heat 11 1st round (→ did not advance)

Men's 200 metres
 Mohammad Sharif Butt
 Heat 9 1st round 22.8 (→ advanced to second round)
 Heat 4 2nd round (→ did not advance)

Men's 110 metres hurdles
 Mazhar-Ul-Haque Khan
 Heat 6 1st round (→ did not advance)

Men's 400 metres hurdles
 Mohsin Nazar Khan
 Heat 2 1st round 59.5 (→ did not advance)

Men's putting the shot
 Ahmed Zahur Khan
 Did not qualify for final
 Nazar Mohammad Malik
 Did not qualify for final

Men's throwing the discus
 Ahmed Zahur Khan
 Did not qualify for final
 Nazar Mohammad Malik
 Did not qualify for final

Boxing

Men's bantamweight (-54 kg)

 Allan Monteiro
 1st round; Lost to Babu Lall (IND) RSC

Men's featherweight (-58 kg)

 Sydney Greve
 1st round; Lost to Dennis Shepherd (RSA) on pts

Men's welterweight (-67 kg)

 Anwar Pasha Turki
 1st round; Lost to A Obeyesekere (CEY) on pts

Cycling

Sprint
 Muhammad Naqi Mallick
 Heat 10 1st round; Lost to Jack Heid (USA)
 Repechage heat 3; Lost to Charlie Bazzano (AUS)

Time trial
 Wazir Ali
 1:24.8 finished 20th out of 21

Individual road race
 Wazir Ali

Hockey

Men's Team Competition

Preliminary Group C

 Defeated  (2-1)
 Defeated  (9-0)
 Defeated  (3-1)
 Defeated  (6-1)

Semifinals

Third place match

Replay of third place match

Pakistan finished 4th

Team Roster

 Ali Iqtidar Shah Dara (captain)
 Shahzada Shahrukh (vice-captain)
 M Anwar Beg Moghal (gk)
 Syed Mohammad Saleem (gk)
 Mohammad Niaz Khan
 Shahzada Mohammad Khurram
 Hamidullah Burki
 Abdul Ghafoor Khan
 Masood Ahmed Khan
 Mahmoodul Hasan Sheikh
 Abdul Aziz Malik
 Abdul Qayyum Khan
 Abdul Razzaq
 Khawaja Mohammad Taqi
 Mukhtar Bhatti
 Abdul Hameed
 Azizur Rehman Khan
 Rehmatullah Sheikh
 Milton D'Mello

Pakistan captain Ali Iqtidar Shah (A I S) Dara had represented (undivided) India's gold medal winning men's hockey team at the 1936 Olympic Games in Berlin. Hockey vice-captain Shahzada Shahrukh appeared for Pakistan in the cycling event of the Melbourne Olympics in 1956

Swimming

Men's 400 metres freestyle

 Anwar Aziz Chaudhry
 Heat 3 1st round; 6:17.4 (→ did not advance)

 Sultan Karamally
 Heat 6 1st round; 7:16.9 (→ did not advance)

Men's 1,500 metres freestyle

 Anwar Aziz Chaudhry
 Heat 1 1st round; 25:37.4 (→ did not advance)

Men's 200 metres breaststroke

 Iftikhar Ahmed Shah
 Heat 3 1st round; 3:28.1 (→ did not advance)

Men's 100 metres backstroke

 Jaffar Ali Shah
 Heat 2 1st round; 1:30.2 (→ did not advance)

Men's 4x200 metres relay

 Anwar Aziz Chaudhry, Sultan Karamally, Iftikhar Ahmed Shah and Jaffar Ali Shah
 Heat 1 1st round; 12:25.8 (→ did not advance)

Weightlifting

Men's middleweight (-75 kg)

 Mohammad Iqbal Butt
 Press 92.5kg
 Snatch 90kg
 Jerk 122.5kg
 Total 305kg (finished 22nd out of 24)

Men's heavyweight (over 82.5 kg)

 Mohammad Naqi Butt
 Press 97.5kg
 Snatch 97.5kg
 Jerk 125kg
 Total 320kg (finished 15th out of 16)

Wrestling Freestyle

 Mohammad Amin (Bantamweight)
 Shaukat Ali (Featherweight)
 Abdul Hamid (Lightweight)
 Mohammad Anwar (Heavyweight)

 All four wrestlers could not compete as they had been mistakenly entered for the Greco-Roman style and not freestyle

References

External links
Official Olympic Reports

Nations at the 1948 Summer Olympics
1948 Summer Olympics
1948 in Pakistani sport